Drypta iris is a species of ground beetle in the genus Drypta that was discovered in 1840. It was named after the goddess Iris.

References

Dryptinae
Beetles described in 1840